The 1925–26 Sheffield Shield season was the 30th season of the Sheffield Shield, the domestic first-class cricket competition of Australia. New South Wales won the championship.

Table

Statistics

Most Runs
Bill Woodfull 597

Most Wickets
John Scott 22

Notable events
New South Wales recorded crushing victories in all four matches - winning three by an innings and the fourth by over 500 runs, scoring 554, 705, 642, 593 and 708 in their innings.

References

Sheffield Shield
Sheffield Shield
Sheffield Shield seasons